José Luis Leal Maldonado (born 1939) is a Spanish politician from the Union of the Democratic Centre (UCD) who served as Minister of Economy from April 1979 to September 1980.

References

1939 births
Living people
Complutense University of Madrid alumni
20th-century Spanish politicians
Economy and finance ministers of Spain